Mohamed Mohsen (born October 1, 1990) is an Egyptian professional footballer who currently plays as a central midfielder for El Qanah.

External links
Mohamed Mohsen at KOOORA.com

References

1990 births
Living people
El Raja SC players
Egyptian footballers
Egyptian expatriate footballers
Association football midfielders
Al Ittihad Alexandria Club players
El Minya SC players
Al Mokawloon Al Arab SC players
Ghazl El Mahalla SC players
Aswan SC players
El Qanah FC players
Al-Sadd FC (Saudi football club) players
Egyptian Premier League players
Saudi Second Division players
Egyptian expatriate sportspeople in Saudi Arabia
Expatriate footballers in Saudi Arabia
Ismaily SC players